Lillord Lake is a lake in geographic Lee Township in the Unorganized West Part of Timiskaming District, in northeastern Ontario, Canada. The lake is in the Saint Lawrence River drainage basin and is the source of Lillord Creek. The nearest community is Sesekinika,  to the east.

There are four unnamed inflows at the south, west, north and northeast. The primary outflow, at the southeast, is Lillord Creek, which flows southeast to Berube Lake on the way to its mouth at the Blanche River. The Blanche River flows via Lake Timiskaming and the Ottawa River to the Saint Lawrence River.

References

Other map sources:

Lakes of Timiskaming District